Kitob District is a district of Qashqadaryo Region in Uzbekistan. The capital lies at the city Kitob. The district consists of one city (Kitob), 13 urban-type settlements (Alaqoʻyliq, Bektemir, Rus qishloq, Baxtdarvozasi, Beshterak, Varganza, Obikanda, Panji, Sariosiyo, Sevaz, Xoji, Yakkatut, Yangiobod) and 12 rural communities.

The district is mainly located on the southern slopes of the Zarafshan Range. The population of the district is overwhelming Tajik, with the Kitob town being almost entirely inhabited by that ethnic group.

In 1979, the Kitab Zapovednik (Geological) reserve was established within the district. It has various protected flora and fauna. Flora includes; Tulipa ingens, Ferula moschata, Acanthophyllum gypsophiloides, Allium stipatatum, Crocus korolkowii, Tulipa turkestanica, Eremurus robustus, Colchicum kesselringii, Sternbergia fischeriana and Iris stolonifera. Birds found in the reserve include; Gyps fulvus, Aegypius monachus, Aquila chrysaetos and Gypaetus barbatus. Animals include Hystrix leucura (Indian crested porcupine), Canis lupus (Grey wolf), Vulpes vulpes (Red fox), Ursus arctos isabellinus (Himalayan brown bear), Martes foina (Stone Marten), Meles meles (European badger) and Sus scrofa (wild boar).

References

Qashqadaryo Region
Districts of Uzbekistan